Doc is a 1971 American Western film, which tells the story of the Gunfight at the O.K. Corral and of one of its protagonists, Doc Holliday. It stars Stacy Keach, Faye Dunaway, and Harris Yulin. It was directed by Frank Perry. Pete Hamill wrote the original screenplay. The film was shot in Almeria in southern Spain.

Plot
Doc Holliday (Stacy Keach) and Kate Elder (Faye Dunaway) spend time at the Continental Hotel in Tombstone, Arizona, hoping to find his old friend Wyatt Earp (Harris Yulin), deputy marshal of Cochise County, who is striving to become the town's new sheriff in the election campaign.

Along the way, Doc meets up with Virgil and Morgan Earp, two of Wyatt's brothers, and follows them to Tombstone. Once Wyatt becomes the sheriff, he and his friend face a fierce resistance from the "Cowboys" gathered around the Clanton family, who want to keep control of the town and don't accept Earp's authority. The Cowboys include Ike Clanton (Michael Witney), Tom and Frank McLaury, and Billy Claiborne.

Doc teaches The Kid (Denver John Collins) how to shoot a pistol. When the Civil War ended, he left Atlanta, Georgia and went to Richmond, Virginia and then to Baltimore, Maryland, to be a dentist. After some time he decided to go out to the West, looking for a drier environment to cure his tuberculosis, for which he visits a Chinaman for herbs. (At another point in the movie, he is taking laudanum.)

In the end, the showdown at the OK Corral takes place during a fiesta. John Behan (Richard McKenzie), Wyatt Earp, and Doc Holliday all survive the gunfight. Ike Clanton, Tom and Frank McClaury, and Billy Claiborne do not.

Cast
 Stacy Keach as Doc Holliday
 Faye Dunaway as Kate Elder
 Harris Yulin as Wyatt Earp
 Michael Witney as Ike Clanton
 Denver John Collins as The Kid
 Dan Greenburg as Clum, editor The Tombstone Epitaph
 John Scanlon  as Bartlett, saloon owner
 Richard McKenzie as Tombstone Sheriff John Behan
 John Bottoms as Virgil Earp
 Ferdinand Zogbaum as James Earp
 Penelope Allen as Mattie Earp
 Hedy Sontag as Alley Earp
 James Greene as Frank McLowery
 Antonia Rey as Concha, whore
 Philip Shafer as Morgan Earp
 Fred Dennis as Johnny Ringo

Awards
Doc won the 1971 Western Writers of America Spur Award for the Best Movie Script by Peter Hamill.

References

External links
 
 
 

1971 films
1971 Western (genre) films
American Western (genre) films
Cultural depictions of Big Nose Kate
Cultural depictions of Doc Holliday
Cultural depictions of Wyatt Earp
Films directed by Frank Perry
Films shot in Almería
United Artists films
1970s English-language films
1970s American films